The St. Louis CG-5 was a 1940s American prototype military transport glider designed and built by the St. Louis Aircraft Corporation.

Development
In 1941 the United States Army Air Force decided to use secondary sources to boost aircraft production and the St. Louis Aircraft Corporation was contracted to design and build a prototype of both an eight-seat and fifteen-seat troop carrying glider. In total with the St. Louis examples, eight prototypes were ordered from different aircraft manufacturers.

The model SL-5 eight seat glider was given the military designation CG-5 and the prototype designated XCG-5. Howard C. Blosom test flew the XCG-5 from Lambert Field in 1942. It proved to have serious aerodynamic flaws and structural problems causing Dutch Roll at speed. The heavier fifteen-seat glider (designated the XCG-6) was not built.

The USAAF ordered the Waco CG-3 for the eight/nine seat requirement, although only 100 were built. The fifteen-seat requirement was met by the Waco CG-4 of which more than 13,000 were built.

Specifications (CG-5)

See also

References

Notes

Further reading

1940s United States military gliders